Eric Engstrand is a Swedish ice hockey left winger who plays for Färjestad BK of the SHL.  He was drafted by the Ottawa Senators in the 5th round of the 2020 NHL Entry Draft with the 155th overall pick.

During the 2022–23 season, in his fourth season in the SHL with the Malmö Redhawks, Engstrand was scoreless in 11 regular season games before opting to leave the club and join reigning champions, Färjestad BK, for the remainder of the season on 8 December 2022.

Career statistics

References

External links

2000 births
Living people
Färjestad BK players
Malmö Redhawks players
Ottawa Senators draft picks
People from Varberg
Södertälje SK players
Swedish ice hockey left wingers
IF Troja/Ljungby players
Sportspeople from Halland County